China Southern Asset Management is a Chinese asset management company founded in 1998. It is considered one of the largest asset management companies in China.

History 
The company was established on March 6, 1998, as one of the first local asset management companies in China that was approved by the China Securities Regulatory Commission.

In 2008, the company set up a joint venture in Hong Kong with Oriental Patron. The joint venture was named CSOP Asset Management with China Southern Asset Management paying HK$140 million for a 70% stake and Oriental Patron paying HK$60 million for the remaining 30%. CSOP Asset management currently has several ETFs on the Hong Kong Stock Exchange. In December 2022, it launched the first Bitcoin and Ethereum ETFs in Hong Kong.

Regulatory issues 
In 2008, Wang Limin who was previously a manager at China Southern Asset Management was banned for seven years from participating in China's capital markets and fined 500,000 RMB after making a profit of 1.5 million RMB via Rat Trading. This involved buying shares in companies his funds invested in and then selling them for a profit.

References

External links 
 
 www.csopasset.com (CSOP Asset Management Website)

Financial services companies of China
Financial services companies established in 1998
Investment management companies of China